Thirakal is a 1984 Indian Malayalam film, directed by K Vijayan and produced by Bhanuprakash V Pai. The film stars Seema, Sukumari, Mohanlal, Jagathy Sreekumar and Kaviyoor Ponnamma in the lead roles. The film has musical score by Shankar–Ganesh.

Cast 

Seema as Saritha
Mohanlal as James George
Jagathy Sreekumar as Varkey
Kaviyoor Ponnamma as Madhaviyamma
Venu Nagavally as Balan
Captain Raju as Chandran
Menaka as Rekha
Sukumari as James's mother
Baby Gayathri as Minikutty
Jagannatha Varma as Thomas George
Lalu Alex as Varghese
Sathyapriya as Sarala
Santhakumari as Rekha's mother
Sukumari as James's mother
Sulekha as Daisy

Soundtrack 
The music was composed by Shankar–Ganesh and the lyrics were written by Poovachal Khader.

References

External links 
 

1984 films
1980s Malayalam-language films
Films scored by Shankar–Ganesh
Films directed by K. Vijayan